The New Journal of Chemistry is a monthly peer-reviewed scientific journal publishing research and review articles on all aspects of chemistry. It is published by the Royal Society of Chemistry on behalf of the French National Centre for Scientific Research (CNRS). It was established as Nouveau Journal de Chimie in 1977, acquiring its current title in 1999. The editors-in-chief are Denise Parent (CNRS) and Sarah Ruthven (RSC). According to the Journal Citation Reports, the journal has a 2020 impact factor of 3.591.

Article types 
 Research papers: which contain original scientific work that has not been published previously
 Letters: original scientific work that is of an urgent nature and that has not been published previously
 Perspectives: invited from younger prize-winning scientists who present their work and ideas, setting these in the context of the work of others
 Interfaces: written by pairs of collaborating scientists from different disciplines on their common field of research, to demonstrate the benefits of collaborative research and facilitate dialogue between communities

See also 
 List of scientific journals in chemistry

References

External links 
 
 New Journal of Chemistry CNRS website

Chemistry journals
Royal Society of Chemistry academic journals
English-language journals
Publications established in 1976
French National Centre for Scientific Research
Monthly journals